The Palestine Liberation Organization (PLO;) is a Palestinian nationalist political and militant organization founded in 1964 with the initial purpose of establishing Arab unity and statehood over the territory of former Mandatory Palestine, in opposition to the State of Israel. In 1993, alongside the Oslo I Accord, the PLO's aspiration for Arab statehood was revised to be specifically for the Palestinian territories under an Israeli occupation since the 1967 Arab–Israeli War. It is headquartered in the city of Al-Bireh in the West Bank, and is recognized as the sole legitimate representative of the Palestinian people by over 100 countries that it has diplomatic relations with. As the official recognized government of the de jure State of Palestine, it has enjoyed observer status at the United Nations (UN) since 1974. Due to its militant activities, including acts of violence primarily aimed at Israeli civilians, the PLO was designated as a terrorist organization by the United States in 1987, although a later presidential waiver has permitted American contact with the organization since 1988. In 1993, the PLO recognized Israel's right to exist in peace, accepted Resolution 242 of the United Nations Security Council, and rejected "violence and terrorism". In response, Israel officially recognized the PLO as a legitimate authority representing the Palestinian people. However, despite its participation in the Oslo Accords, the PLO continued to employ tactics of violence in the following years, particularly during the Second Intifada of 2000–2005. On 29 October 2018, the Palestinian Central Council suspended the Palestinian recognition of Israel, and subsequently halted all forms of security and economic cooperation with it.

Founding
At its first summit meeting in Cairo in 1964, the Arab League initiated the creation of an organization representing the Palestinian people. The Palestinian National Council convened in Jerusalem on 28 May 1964. After concluding the meeting, the PLO was founded on 2 June 1964. Its stated "complementary goals" were Arab unity and the liberation of Palestine.

Ideology

The ideology of the PLO was formulated in the founding year, 1964, in the Palestinian National Covenant. In 1968, the Charter was replaced by a comprehensively revised version.

Until 1993, the only promoted option was armed struggle. From the signing of the Oslo Accords, negotiation and diplomacy became the only official policy.

In April 1996, a large number of articles, which were inconsistent with the Oslo Accords, were wholly or partially nullified.

At the core of the PLO's ideology is the belief that Zionists had unjustly expelled the Palestinians from Palestine and established a Jewish state in place under the pretext of having historic and Jewish ties with Palestine. The PLO demanded that Palestinian refugees be allowed to return to their homes. This is expressed in the National Covenant:

Article 2 of the Charter states that ″Palestine, with the boundaries it had during the British mandate, is an indivisible territorial unit″, meaning that there is no place for a Jewish state. This article was adapted in 1996 to meet the Oslo Accords.

Article 20 states: ″The Balfour Declaration, the Mandate for Palestine, and everything that has been based upon them, are deemed null and void. Claims of historical or religious ties of Jews with Palestine are incompatible with the facts of history and the true conception of what constitutes statehood. Judaism, being a religion, is not an independent nationality. Nor do Jews constitute a single nation with an identity of its own; they are citizens of the states to which they belong″. This article was nullified in 1996.

Article 3 reads: ″The Palestinian Arab people possess the legal right to their homeland and have the right to determine their destiny after achieving the liberation of their country in accordance with their wishes and entirely of their own accord and will″.

Secularism versus adherence to Islam
The PLO and its dominating faction, Fatah, are often contrasted to more religious orientated factions like Hamas and the Palestinian Islamic Jihad (PIJ). All, however, represent a predominant Muslim population. Practically the whole population of the Territories is Muslim, mostly Sunni. Around 50,000 (ca 1%) of the 4.6 million Palestinians in the occupied Palestinian territories (OPT) are Palestinian Christian.

Under President Arafat, the Fatah-dominated Palestinian Authority adopted the 2003 Amended Basic Law, which stipulates Islam as the sole official religion in Palestine and the principles of Islamic sharia as a principal source of legislation. The draft Constitution contains the same provisions. The draft Constitution was formulated by a Constitutional Committee, established by Arafat in 1999 and endorsed by the PLO.

Organization

Structure

The PLO incorporates a range of generally secular ideologies of different Palestinian movements "committed to the struggle for Palestinian independence and liberation," hence the name of the organization. It's formally an umbrella organization that includes "numerous organizations of the resistance movement, political parties, and popular organizations." From the beginning, the PLO was designed as a government in exile, with a parliament, the Palestine National Council (PNC), chosen by the Palestinian people, as the highest authority in the PLO, and an executive government (EC), elected by the PNC. In practice, however, the organization was rather a hierarchic one with a military-like character, needed for its function as a liberation organization, the "liberation of Palestine".

The Palestinian National Charter describes the ideology of the PLO. A constitution, named "Fundamental Law", was adopted, which dictates the inner structure of the organization and the representation of the Palestinian people. A draft Constitution was written in 1963, to rule the PLO until free general elections among all the Palestinians in all the countries in which they resided could be held. The Constitution was revised in 1968.

Institutions
The Palestinian National Council has 740 members and the Executive Committee or ExCo has 18 members. The Palestinian Central Council or CC or PCC, established by the PNC in 1973, is the second leading body of the PLO. The CC consists of 124 members from the PLO Executive Committee, PNC, PLC and other Palestinian organizations. The EC includes 15 representatives of the PLC. The CC functions as an intermediary body between the PNC and the EC. The CC makes policy decisions when PNC is not in session, acting as a link between the PNC and the PLO-EC. The CC is elected by the PNC and chaired by the PNC speaker.

The PNC serves as the parliament for all Palestinians inside and outside of the Occupied Palestinian Territory, including Jerusalem. The PLO is governed internally by its "Fundamental Law", which describes the powers and the relations between the organs of the PLO.

Ahmad Shukeiri was the first Chairman of the PLO Executive Committee from 1964 to 1967. In 1967, he was replaced by Yahia Hammuda. Yasser Arafat occupied the position from 1969 until his death in 2004. He was succeeded by Mahmoud Abbas (also known as Abu Mazen).

According to an internal PLO document, the current PNC continues to act if elections are not possible. In absence of elections, most of the members of the PNC are appointed by the executive committee. The document further states that "the PNC represents all sectors of the Palestinian community worldwide, including numerous organizations of the resistance movement, political parties, popular organizations and independent personalities and figures from all sectors of life, including intellectuals, religious leaders and businessmen".

Challenged representation
As of 2015, there have not been elections for many years, neither for the PNC, nor for the EC, the PCC or the President of the State of Palestine. The executive committee has formally 18 members, including its chairman, but in past years many vacant seats in the Executive remained empty. Moreover, Hamas, the largest representative of the inhabitants of the Palestinian Territories alongside Fatah, is not represented in the PLO at all. The results of the last parliamentary elections for the PLC, held in the Territories in 2006, with Hamas as the big winner while not even a member of the PLO, "underlined the clear lack of a popular mandate by the PLO leadership", according to PASSIA. Individual elected members of the PLC representing Hamas, however, are automatically members of the PNC.

The representative status of the PLO has often been challenged in the past. It was for example doubted in 2011 by a group of Palestinian lawyers, jurists and legal scholars, due to lack of elections. They questioned the PLO's legitimacy to alter the status and role of the Organization in respect of their status within the UN. They demanded immediate and direct elections to the Palestine National Council to ″activate representative PLO institutions in order to preserve, consolidate, and strengthen the effective legal representation of the Palestinian people as a whole″, before changing the status within the UN.

PLO versus PA
The 1993–1995 Oslo Accords deliberately detached the Palestinian population in the Occupied Palestinian Territories from the PLO and the Palestinians in exile by creating a Palestinian Authority (PA) for the Territories. A separate parliament and government were established. Mahmoud Abbas was one of the architects of the Oslo Accords.

Although many in the PLO opposed the Oslo Agreements, the executive committee and the Central Council approved the Accords. It marked the beginning of the PLO's decline, as the PA came to replace the PLO as the prime Palestinian political institution. Political factions within the PLO that had opposed the Oslo process were marginalized.

The PLO managed to overcome the separation by uniting the power in PLO and PA in one individual, Yasser Arafat. In 2002, Arafat held the functions of Chairman of the PLO/Executive Committee; Chairman of Fatah, the dominating faction within the PLO; as well as President of the Palestinian National Authority. He also controlled the Palestinian National Security Forces.

Only during the Hamas-led PA Government in 2006–2007 did the PLO resurface. After Hamas took over Gaza in 2007, Abbas issued a decree suspending the PLC and some sections of the Palestinian Basic Law, and appointed Salam Fayyad as prime minister.

The PLO remains the official representative of the State of Palestine at the UN.

Internal politics
On 4 February 1969, Fatah founder, Arafat, was elected Chairman of the PLO in Cairo. Since, Fatah has been the dominant factor within the PLO, which still continues in 2015.

Under pressure from the international community led by Israel and US, and from inside his own party Fatah, Arafat partially transferred some of his strongly centralized power in 2003, causing strong tensions within the Palestinian leadership. Arafat appointed Mahmoud Abbas as prime minister, but this resulted in disputes about the transfer of tasks and responsibilities. Abbas was strongly supported by the US and the international community, because he was supposed to be more willing to give far-reaching concessions to Israel. While Arafat had retained most of his power and a power struggle within Fatah continued, the leadership was criticised for corruption and nepotism.

After Arafat's death, Abbas increasingly gained exclusive powers within both PLO and PA as well as in Fatah, until he had acquired the same power as was previously held by Arafat. Abbas is criticized for his autocratic rule and refusal to share powers and plans with other Palestinians. In the absence of a functioning parliament and Executive, he even began to issue his own laws. Senior representative of Abbas' Fatah faction and former Fatah minister of prisoner affairs, Sufian Abu Zaida, complained that Abbas appointed himself as the chief judge and prosecutor, making a mockery of the Palestinian judicial system. There appeared reports of widespread corruption and nepotism within the Palestinian Authority. Only Hamas-ruled Gaza has a more or less functioning parliament.

2015 struggle for power

With a de facto defunct parliament and Executive, Mahmoud Abbas increasingly gained exclusive powers within both PLO and PA, as well as in Fatah. After the announcement in August 2015 of Abbas' resignation as Chairman of the Executive Committee and of nine other members as well, many Palestinians saw the move as just an attempt to replace some members in the executive committee, or to force a meeting of the PNC and remain in their jobs until the PNC decides whether to accept or to reject their resignations. Met with fierce criticism by many Palestinian factions, a session of the PNC, who had to approve the resignations, was postponed indefinitely.

Political status
The Palestine Liberation Organization is recognized by the Arab League as "the sole and legitimate representative of the Palestinian people", and by the United Nations as "the representative of the Palestinian people".

The PLO was designated a terrorist organization by the United States in 1987, but in 1988, a presidential waiver was issued, which permitted contact with the organization. Most of the rest of the world recognized the PLO as the legitimate representatives of the Palestinian people from the mid-1970s onwards (after the PLO's admission to the UN as an observer.)

In 1993, PLO chairman Yasser Arafat recognized the State of Israel in an official letter to its prime minister, Yitzhak Rabin. In response to Arafat's letter, Israel decided to revise its stance toward the PLO and to recognize the organization as the representative of the Palestinian people. This led to the signing of the Oslo Accords in 1993.

Status at the United Nations

Observer status
The United Nations General Assembly recognized the PLO as the "representative of the Palestinian people" in Resolution 3210 and Resolution 3236, and granted the PLO observer status on 22 November 1974 in Resolution 3237. On 12 January 1976, the UN Security Council voted 11–1 with 3 abstentions to allow the Palestinian Liberation Organization to participate in a Security Council debate without voting rights, a privilege usually restricted to UN member states. It was admitted as a full member of the Asia group on 2 April 1986.

After the Palestinian Declaration of Independence the PLO's representation was renamed Palestine. On 7 July 1998, this status was extended to allow participation in General Assembly debates, though not in voting.

2011 application for UN state membership
When President Mahmoud Abbas submitted an application for UN state membership, in September 2011, Palestinian lawyers, jurists and legal scholars expressed their concern that the change of Palestine's status in the UN (since 1988 designated as "Palestine" in place of "Palestine Liberation Organization") could have negative implications on the legal position of the Palestinian people. They warned for the risk of fragmentation, where the State of Palestine would represent the people within the UN and the PLO represent the people outside the UN, the latter including the Palestinians in exile, where refugees constitute more than half of the Palestinian people. They were also afraid of the loss of representation of the refugees in the UN. In Resolution 67/19 November 2012, Palestine was at last awarded non-member observer State status, but the General Assembly maintained the status of the PLO.

′Non-member observer state′ status
By September 2012, with their application for full membership stalled due to the inability of Security Council members to 'make a unanimous recommendation', the PLO had decided to pursue an upgrade in status from "observer entity" to  "non-member observer state". On 29 November 2012, Resolution 67/19 passed, upgrading Palestine to "non-member observer State" status in the United Nations. The new status equates Palestine's with that of the Holy See.

Diplomatic representation

The Palestine Information Office was registered with the Justice Department of the United States as a foreign agent until 1968, when it was closed. It was reopened in 1989 as the Palestine Affairs Center. The PLO Mission office, in Washington D.C was opened in 1994, and represented the PLO in the United States. On 20 July 2010, the United States Department of State agreed to upgrade the status of the PLO Mission in the United States to "General Delegation of the PLO".  Secretary of State Tillerson in 2017 determined that the PLO Mission broke US law prescribing the PLO Mission from attempting to get the International Criminal Court to prosecute Israelis for offences against Palestinians, under penalty of closure.  On 10 September 2018, National security advisor John Bolton announced the closure of the PLO Mission; Nauert, a U.S. Department of State spokeswoman, cited as a reason Palestine's "push to have the International Criminal Court investigate Israel for possible war crimes."

Peace process

Initially, as a guerrilla organization, the PLO performed actions against Israel in the 1970s and early 1980s, regarded as terroristic activities by Israel and regarded as a war of liberation by the PLO. In 1988, however, the PLO officially endorsed a two-state solution, contingent on terms such as making East Jerusalem capital of the Palestinian state and giving Palestinians the right of return to land occupied by Palestinians prior to 1948, as well as the right to continue armed struggle until the end of "The Zionist Entity." In 1996, the PLO nullified the articles of the PLO's Charter, or parts of it, which called for the destruction of Israel and for armed resistance.

Ten Point Program

Following the failure of the armies of Egypt and Syria to defeat Israel in October 1973 Yom Kippur War, which broke the status quo existing since June 1967 Six-Day War, the PLO began formulating a strategic alternative. Now, they intended to establish a "national authority" over every territory they would be able to reconquer. From 1 to 9 June 1974, the Palestine National Council held its 12th meeting in Cairo. On 8 June, the Ten Point Program was adopted. The Program stated:

By "every part of Palestinian territory that is liberated" was implicitly meant the West Bank and Gaza Strip, albeit presented as an interim goal. The final goal remained "completing the liberation of all Palestinian territory" and "recover all their national rights and, first and foremost, their rights to return and to self-determination on the whole of the soil of their homeland". Also UN Resolution 242 was still rejected.

While clinging to armed struggle as the prime means, the PLO no longer excluded peaceful means. Therefore, the Ten Point Program was considered the first attempt by the PLO at peaceful resolution. In October 1974, the Arab League proclaimed the PLO "the sole legitimate representative of the Palestinian people in any Palestinian territory that is liberated", and also the UN recognized the PLO. From then, the diplomatic road was prepared. On the other hand, the Program was rejected by more radical factions and eventually caused a split in the movement.

First Intifada

In 1987, the First Intifada broke out in the West Bank and Gaza Strip. The Intifada caught the PLO by surprise, and the leadership abroad could only indirectly influence the events. A new local leadership emerged, the Unified National Leadership of the Uprising (UNLU), comprising many leading Palestinian factions. After King Hussein of Jordan proclaimed the administrative and legal separation of the West Bank from Jordan in 1988, the Palestine National Council adopted the Palestinian Declaration of Independence in Algiers, proclaiming an independent State of Palestine. The declaration made reference to UN resolutions without explicitly mentioning Security Council Resolutions 242 and 338.

A month later, Arafat declared in Geneva that the PLO would support a solution to the conflict based on these Resolutions. Effectively, the PLO recognized Israel's right to exist within pre-1967 borders, with the understanding that the Palestinians would be allowed to set up their own state in the West Bank and Gaza. The United States accepted this clarification by Arafat and began to allow diplomatic contacts with PLO officials. The Proclamation of Independence did not lead to statehood, although over 100 states recognised the State of Palestine.

Oslo Accords

In 1993, the PLO secretly negotiated the Oslo Accords with Israel. The accords were signed on 20 August 1993, with a subsequent public ceremony in Washington D.C. on 13 September 1993 with Yasser Arafat and Yitzhak Rabin. The Accords granted Palestinians the right to self-government in the Gaza Strip and the city of Jericho in the West Bank through the creation of the Palestinian Authority. Yasser Arafat was appointed head of the Palestinian Authority and a timetable for elections was laid out. The headquarters of the PLO were moved to Ramallah on the West Bank.

History and armed actions

Early actions
The PLO began their militancy campaign from its inception with an attack on Israel's National Water Carrier in January 1965. The group used guerrilla tactics to attack Israel from their bases in Jordan (including the West Bank), Lebanon, Egypt (Gaza Strip), and Syria.

The most notable of what were considered terrorist acts committed by member organizations of the PLO were:
The 1970 Avivim school bus massacre by the Democratic Front for the Liberation of Palestine (DFLP), killed nine children, three adults and crippled 19.
In the late 1960s and early 1970s, the Popular Front for the Liberation of Palestine, the second-largest PLO faction after al-Fatah, carried out a number of attacks and plane hijackings mostly directed at Israel, most infamously the Dawson's Field hijackings, which precipitated the Black September crisis.
In 1972, the Black September Organization carried out the Munich massacre of Israeli Olympic athletes.
In 1974, members of the DFLP seized a school in Israel and killed a total of 26 students and adults and wounded over 70 in the Ma'alot massacre.
The 1975, Savoy Hotel hostage situation killing 8 hostages and 3 soldiers, carried out by Fatah.
The 1978, Coastal Road massacre killing 37 Israelis and wounding 76, also carried out by Fatah.

War of Attrition

From 1967 to September 1970 the PLO, with passive support from Jordan, fought a war of attrition with Israel. During this time, the PLO launched artillery attacks on the moshavim and kibbutzim of Bet Shean Valley Regional Council, while fedayeen launched numerous attacks on Israeli forces. Israel raided the PLO camps in Jordan, including Karameh, withdrawing only under Jordanian military pressure.

This conflict culminated in Jordan's expulsion of the PLO to Lebanon in July 1971.

Black September

The PLO suffered a major reversal with the Jordanian assault on its armed groups, in the events known as Black September in 1970. The Palestinian groups were expelled from Jordan, and during the 1970s, the PLO was effectively an umbrella group of eight organizations headquartered in Damascus and Beirut, all devoted to armed struggle against Zionism or Israeli occupation, using methods which included direct clashing and guerrilla warfare against Israel. After Black September, the Cairo Agreement led the PLO to establish itself in Lebanon.

Lebanon and the Lebanese Civil War

In the late 1960s, and especially after the expulsion of the Palestinian militants from Jordan in Black September events in 1970–1971, Lebanon had become the base for PLO operations. Palestinian militant organizations relocated their headquarters to South Lebanon, and relying on the support in Palestinian refugee camps, waged a campaign of attacks on the Galilee and on Israeli and Jewish targets worldwide. Increasing penetration of Palestinians into Lebanese politics and Israeli retaliations gradually deteriorated the situation.

By the mid-1970s, Arafat and his Fatah movement found themselves in a tenuous position. Arafat increasingly called for diplomacy, perhaps best symbolized by his Ten Point Program and his support for a UN Security Council resolution proposed in 1976 calling for a two-state settlement on the pre-1967 borders. But the Rejectionist Front denounced the calls for diplomacy, and a diplomatic solution was vetoed by the United States. In 1975, the increasing tensions between Palestinian militants and Christian militias exploded into the Lebanese Civil War, involving all factions. On 20 January 1976, the PLO took part in the Damour massacre in retaliation to the Karantina massacre. The PLO and Lebanese National Movement attacked the Christian town of Damour, killing 684 civilians and forcing the remainder of the town's population to flee. In 1976 Syria joined the war by invading Lebanon, beginning the 29‑year Syrian occupation of Lebanon, and in 1978 Israel invaded South Lebanon in response to the Coastal Road Massacre, executed by Palestinian militants based in Lebanon.

The population in the West Bank and Gaza Strip saw Arafat as their best hope for a resolution to the conflict. This was especially so in the aftermath of the Camp David Accords of 1978 between Israel and Egypt, which the Palestinians saw as a blow to their aspirations to self-determination. Abu Nidal, a sworn enemy of the PLO since 1974, assassinated the PLO's diplomatic envoy to the European Economic Community, which in the Venice Declaration of 1980 had called for the Palestinian right of self-determination to be recognized by Israel.

Opposition to Arafat was fierce not only among radical Arab groups, but also among many on the Israeli right. This included Menachem Begin, who had stated on more than one occasion that even if the PLO accepted UN Security Council Resolution 242 and recognized Israel's right to exist, he would never negotiate with the organization. This contradicted the official United States position that it would negotiate with the PLO if the PLO accepted Resolution 242 and recognized Israel, which the PLO had thus far been unwilling to do. Other Arab voices had recently called for a diplomatic resolution to the hostilities in accord with the international consensus, including Egyptian leader Anwar Sadat on his visit to Washington, DC in August 1981, and Crown Prince Fahd of Saudi Arabia in his 7 August peace proposal; together with Arafat's diplomatic maneuver, these developments made Israel's argument that it had "no partner for peace" seem increasingly problematic. Thus, in the eyes of Israeli hard-liners, "the Palestinians posed a greater challenge to Israel as a peacemaking organization than as a military one".

After the appointment of Ariel Sharon to the post of Minister of Defense in 1981, the Israeli government policy of allowing political growth to occur in the occupied West Bank and Gaza strip changed. The Israeli government tried, unsuccessfully, to dictate terms of political growth by replacing local pro-PLO leaders with an Israeli civil administration.

In 1982, after an attack on a senior Israeli diplomat by Lebanon-based Palestinian militants in Lebanon, Israel invaded Lebanon in a much larger scale in coordination with the Lebanese Christian militias, reaching Beirut and eventually resulting in ousting of the PLO headquarters in June that year. Low-level Palestinian insurgency in Lebanon continued in parallel with the consolidation of Shia militant organizations, but became a secondary concern to Israeli military and other Lebanese factions. With ousting of the PLO, the Lebanese Civil War gradually turned into a prolonged conflict, shifting from mainly PLO-Christian conflict into involvement of all Lebanese factions – whether Sunni, Shia, Druze, and Christians.

Tunis
In 1982, the PLO relocated to Tunis, Tunisia after it was driven out of Lebanon by Israel during the 1982 Lebanon War. Following massive raids by Israeli forces in Beirut, it is estimated that 8,000 PLO fighters evacuated the city and dispersed.

On 1 October 1985, in Operation Wooden Leg, Israeli Air Force F-15s bombed the PLO's Tunis headquarters, killing more than 60 people.

It is suggested that the Tunis period (1982–1991) was a negative point in the PLO's history, leading up to the Oslo negotiations and formation of the Palestinian Authority (PA). The PLO in exile was distant from a concentrated number of Palestinians and became far less effective. There was a significant reduction in centres of research, political debates or journalistic endeavours that had encouraged an energised public presence of the PLO in Beirut. More and more Palestinians were abandoned, and many felt that this was the beginning of the end.

Second Intifada

The Second or Al-Aqsa Intifada started concurrently with the breakdown of July 2000 Camp David talks between Palestinian Authority Chairman Yasser Arafat and Israeli Prime Minister Ehud Barak. The Intifada never ended officially, but violence hit relatively low levels during 2005. The death toll, including both military personnel and civilians, of the entire conflict in 2000–2004 is estimated to be 3,223 Palestinians and 950 Israelis, although this number is criticized for not differentiating between combatants and civilians. Members of the PLO have claimed responsibility for a number of attacks against Israelis during the Second Intifada.
The PLO has been sued in the United States by families of those killed or injured in attacks by Palestinians. One lawsuit was settled prior to going to trial. The other went to trial. The PLO was found liable for the death and injuries of US citizens in a number of terrorist attacks in Israel from 2001 to 2004 and ordered to pay a judgment of $655.5 million. The verdict was overturned on appeal for a lack of US federal jurisdiction over actions committed overseas.

Wealth controversy
According to a 1993 report by the British National Criminal Intelligence Service, the PLO was "the richest of all terrorist organizations", with $8–$10 billion in assets and an annual income of $1.5–$2 billion from "donations, extortion, payoffs, illegal arms dealing, drug trafficking, money laundering, fraud, etc." Estimates of the Palestine Liberation Organization's alleged hidden assets vary wildly and only Arafat had the whole picture. A former PLO finance minister said it was $3 billion to $5 billion.

Membership

Present members include
Fatah – largest faction, secular, left-wing nationalist.
Popular Front for the Liberation of Palestine (PFLP) – second largest, radical left militant and communist
Democratic Front for the Liberation of Palestine (DFLP) – third largest, communist
Palestinian People's Party (PPP) – socialist
Palestinian Liberation Front (PLF, Abu Abbas faction) – minor left-wing breakaway from the Popular Front for the Liberation of Palestine – General Command, after the looting of Beirut in 1975 for which Abu Abbas was blamed.
Arab Liberation Front (ALF) – minor faction, aligned to the Iraqi-led Ba'ath Party
As-Sa'iqa – Syrian-controlled Ba'athist faction
Palestinian Democratic Union (Fida) – minor democratic socialist, two-state solution, non militant faction
Palestinian Popular Struggle Front (PPSF, Samir Ghawsha faction) – minor socialist faction
Palestinian Arab Front (PAF) – minor pro-Fatah, former Iraqi Ba'athist faction

Former member groups of the PLO include
Palestinian Liberation Front (PLF, Abu Nidal Ashqar wing) – socialist
Popular Front for the Liberation of Palestine – General Command (PFLP-GC) – aligned to Syria
Revolutionary Palestinian Communist Party (RPCP) – communist
Fatah al-Intifada – Syrian-controlled, leftist split from Fatah
Palestinian Popular Struggle Front (PPSF, Khalid ʽAbd al-Majid faction) – leftist split from PSF

Executive Committee Chairmen
Ahmad Shukeiri (2 June 1964 – 24 December 1967)
Yahya Hammuda (24 December 1967 –  2 February 1969)
Yasser Arafat "Abu Amar" (4 February 1969 – 11 November 2004)
(in exile in Jordan to April 1971; Lebanon 1971 – December 1982; and Tunis December 1982 – May 1994)
Mahmoud Abbas "Abu Mazen" (From 29 October 2004 – present)
(acting [for Arafat] until 11 November 2004)

See also

Alliance of Palestinian Forces
Fatah–Hamas conflict
History of the State of Palestine
Human rights in the State of Palestine
Israeli–Palestinian conflict
Palestine Liberation Army
Palestinian political violence
Palestinian territories
PLO Negotiations Affairs Department
Palestinian exodus from Kuwait (1990–91)
Rejectionist Front
Timeline of the Israeli–Palestinian conflict

References

Bibliography

Yezid Sayigh, "Struggle Within, Struggle Without: the Transformation of PLO politics since 1982," International Affairs vol. 65, no. 2 (spring 1989) pages 247–271.

External links

Official sites
PLO Negotiations Affairs Department
Permanent Observer Mission of Palestine to the United Nations

Documents
Statement of Proclamation of the Organization (1964)
Palestinian National Charter (1968) published by The Avalon Project at Yale Law School
Palestinian National Charter (1968) on Wikisource
Palestinian National Charter (1964) published by the Permanent Observer Mission of Palestine to the United Nations
PLO Political Program Adopted at the 12th Session of the Palestine National Council Cairo, 8 June 1974 published by the Permanent Observer Mission of Palestine to the United Nations
 published by the Permanent Observer Mission of Palestine to the United Nations]
Constitution of the Palestine Liberation Organization (PLO) (1968)

Analysis
Commentary on the Palestine National Charter published by the Jewish Virtual Library
Dean Peter F. Krogh Discusses the Israeli-Palestinian Conflict from the Dean Peter Krogh Foreign Affairs Digital Archives

General
PLO in Oxford Islamic Studies Online
Palestinian Factions CRS Report for Congress, Aaron D. Pina, 8 June 2005
Brief history of the Palestine Liberation Organization by GlobalSecurity.org
Collection of Documents, Biographies and other information on the Palestine Liberation Organization published by the Jewish Virtual Library
The Palestinian Vision of Peace (2002) as stated by the PLO Negotiations Affairs Department
Documents regarding the Soviet Ministry of Defense 1983 special operation requested by Yasir Arafat: delivery of two German-built coast guard cutters belonging to the PLO from Syria to Tunis – (PDF in Russian) from the Soviet Archives V.Bukovsky, Soviet Archive collected by Vladimir Bukovsky
Photo enlargement shows Palestinians marching in West Berlin, 15 November 69.
Collection of over 150 PLO posters
Palestine – P.L.O. Information bulletin Archive. Some archived issues: 1978, 1979, 1982

 
1960s establishments in Egypt
National liberation movements
Organizations formerly designated as terrorist
Palestinian terrorism
Resistance movements
Popular fronts